Kings Dominion is an amusement park located in Doswell, Virginia,  north of Richmond and  south of Washington, D.C. Owned and operated by Cedar Fair, the  park opened to the public on May 3, 1975, and features more than 60 rides, shows and attractions including 13 roller coasters and a  water park. Its name is derived from the name of its sister park, Kings Island, and the nickname for the state of Virginia, "Old Dominion."

History

Early history as Kings Dominion (1972–83)

Following the success of Kings Island in Mason, Ohio, Family Leisure Centers (a partnership formed between Taft Broadcasting Company and Top Value Enterprises) decided to expand into a new region of the country by opening a second park. A  site was chosen in Doswell, Virginia, with construction beginning on October 1, 1972. The new park was designed with similar themes, rides, and activities as sister park Kings Island.

Following a limited preview of the park's Lion Country Safari, a drive-through animal zoo with 230 species of animals, and the Scooby-Doo rollercoaster in 1974, Kings Dominion officially opened on May 3, 1975, offering fifteen attractions including the Rebel Yell (later renamed Racer 75), the Lion Country Safari Monorail, Galaxie, and a junior wooden roller coaster known as Scooby-Doo. Also present at the opening was a log flume, steam train, a collection of flat rides and a cable-car sky ride that transported visitors between Old Virginia and The Happy Land of Hanna-Barbera. In addition, Kings Dominion's 1/3-scale replica of the Eiffel Tower and the International Street Fountain greet visitors near the main entrance to the park. Original themed areas included The Happy Land of Hanna-Barbera, International Street, Lion Country Safari, Old Virginia, and Coney Island. Daily admission price in 1975 was $7.50, and a dollar for parking. Opening day of the park saw 50,000 guests, with an additional 50,000-60,000 guests waiting to enter. 

Kings Dominion added its fourth roller coaster, a Schwarzkopf shuttle loop known as the King Kobra, in 1977. The King Kobra featured a 50-ton counterweight drop launch and was the park's first launched roller coaster. It was in the park for nine seasons before being relocated to Jolly Roger Amusement Park in Ocean City, Maryland, Alton Towers in England, and later to Hopi Hari in Brazil where it exists today as Katapul. Also in 1977, Kings Dominion was one of several amusement parks serving as location for the film Rollercoaster.

A campground was completed in time for the 1978 season and the park's well-known Lost World mountain debuted in 1979. Originally, the Lost World featured three rides: a flume ride called Voyage to Atlantis, a children's attraction mine ride known as Land of the Dooz, and a rotor called Time Shaft. Only a year later in 1980, the flume ride was rethemed Haunted River. Kings Dominion later expanded Old Virginia with the addition of the park's third wooden roller coaster, the Grizzly, in 1982 and a river rapids ride called White Water Canyon in 1983.

Kings Dominion was also active in political lobbying.  They and other entertainment businesses convinced Virginia to make it illegal for schools to start classes before the Labor Day holiday in early September.  They thought that if students were not able to attend school in August, then more families would spend money at Kings Dominion, and more teenagers would be able to provide a low-cost workforce to the amusement park.  This law, known as the Kings Dominion Law after the amusement park, stayed in force until 2019.

Growth under KECO management (1983–92)

Taft Broadcasting Company sold its theme park division in late 1983 for $167.5 million to Kings Entertainment Company (KECO), a new company formed by senior executives and general managers of Taft's Amusement Park Group.  Three parks were involved in the sale – Kings Island, Kings Dominion, and Carowinds – along with a 20-percent stake in Canada's Wonderland. American Financial Group later purchased KECO in 1987 but allowed KECO to continue to manage operations at the amusement parks.

One of the first additions under the new management group was Berserker – a looping starship ride added to International Street in 1984.  Also that year, Smurf Mountain replaced the mine ride Land of the Dooz, transforming the Lost World into The Smurfs theme.  Kings Dominion unveiled a TOGO stand-up roller coaster in 1986 called Shockwave, the first of three roller coasters to be added under KECO.  Shockwave had one loop, similar to the older King Kobra but added a helix.  King Kobra was removed at the end of the season.  A water slide complex known as Racing Rivers opened in 1987, and Avalanche, which remains the only Mack bobsled roller coaster in the United States, debuted the following year in 1988. The trains of Avalanche now known as “Reptilian” were themed after bobsleds from various countries including the United States, France, Germany, Canada and Switzerland creating the experience of a bobsled race in the Winter Olympics.

Kings Dominion continued to expand over the next few seasons starting with Hanna-Barbera Land in 1990 with the addition of more children's flat rides. A new, looping roller coaster from Arrow Dynamics called Anaconda was introduced the following year in 1991 featuring the world's first underwater tunnel which travels under part of Lake Charles.  Anaconda was also originally billed as having six loops, but unlike Arrow's six-inversion coaster Drachen Fire that opened at Busch Gardens Williamsburg the following year, the Anaconda actually has only four inversions: a vertical loop, a sidewinder, and two consecutive corkscrews.

A new  water park addition called Hurricane Reef opened in 1992. To build the water park, Kings Dominion filled in two-thirds of Lake Charles near the Candy Apple Grove region of the park.

Paramount era (1993–2006)

Kings Dominion continued its growth when it became part of Paramount Parks in 1993 and switched its name to Paramount's Kings Dominion. New attractions and areas of the park themed to Paramount's television shows and films appeared at Paramount's Kings Dominion almost every season that they were under Paramount's ownership. In 1993, they added a motion simulator attraction, originally featuring the Days of Thunder film, and Lion County Safari was removed at the end of the season. Also in 1993, Smurf Mountain was removed, leaving only the Time Shaft and Haunted River remaining in The Lost World Mountain until 1995 when both rides were removed. The 1994 season saw the addition of a new area of the park themed to the 1992 Paramount motion picture Wayne's World, which featured its third full-size wooden roller coaster, Hurler, a shop called the Rock Shop, and a Stan Mikita's restaurant similar to the one featured in the film. Since then, the Wayne's World section has been merged into the Candy Apple Grove; the Stan Mikita's was converted to the Juke Box Diner, and the Hurler was converted into Twisted Timbers, the park's newest roller coaster, in 2018. In the next year, another children's area, known as Nickelodeon Splat City, opened near the Shockwave roller coaster, this was a product of Viacom purchasing Paramount in 1994. This was later converted into Nick Central. In the 1995 season, The Skyride and The Singing Mushrooms were removed.

In 1996, Kings Dominion introduced its second launched roller coaster, and first LIM-launched roller coaster, The Outer Limits: Flight of Fear. The Outer Limits has a  launch, four inversions, and an identical "spaghetti bowl" layout to Flight of Fear at Kings Island. Almost as notable as the launch of The Outer Limits was the fact that the entire ride was in semi-darkness; the riders could not see where they were going. Five years after The Outer Limits opened, Paramount Parks' licensing agreement to use theming from the television show after which the ride was named expired; the Outer Limits theming in the ride and its queue was removed, and the ride was renamed Flight of Fear. After the 2000 season, Flight of Fear's trains received lap bars instead of shoulder restraints.

1997 featured the debut of KidZville, a re-theming of the Hanna-Barbera section. The park added the new Taxi Jam roller coaster, and Scooby's Playpark became a construction-themed playpen called Kidz Construction Company. Yogi's Cave was rethemed to Treasure Cave and many rides in KidZville, such as Scooby-Doo's Ghoster Coaster, George Jetson's Spaceport, and Huck's Hot Rods, continued to bear the names of Hanna-Barbera characters.

Kings Dominion added another launched roller coaster in 1998, Volcano: The Blast Coaster, in the former Lost World mountain. The mountain's previous rides had all been removed several years previously, and Volcano gave the mountain a major transformation. Volcano, which was manufactured by Intamin, was the world's first LIM-launched inverted roller coaster. The ride featured two separate launch sections, a roll-out inversion on the top of the mountain, and three heartline rolls on the way back down. Volcano was themed to the 1997 film Volcano; the other Paramount Parks added inverted or suspended roller coasters themed to Top Gun around the same time. During the next two seasons, Kings Dominion expanded Hurricane Reef behind the Rebel Yell and renamed it WaterWorks. The new portion of WaterWorks includes Pipeline Peak, a set of four enclosed water slides, one of which (the Night Slider) is the world's tallest dark free-fall slide. In 2000, Nick Central opened, replacing Nick Splat City and part of Kidzville.

The park added its third launched roller coaster, Hypersonic XLC, in 2001. The entire ride's duration was about 25 seconds. Hypersonic XLC broke down frequently and was closed for the first three months of its second season; no other Paramount Parks installed a similar ride. Nevertheless, Hypersonic XLC helped establish Kings Dominion's reputation as "the launched coaster capital of the world". Hypersonic XLC was removed after the 2007 season.

The early 2000s saw Kings Dominion opening new rides similar to existing rides at other Paramount Parks. In 2002, the park opened its new wild mouse roller coaster, Ricochet (Now known as Apple Zapple), Carowinds also installed its Ricochet in 2002. Diamond Falls, the Shoot the Chute ride closed that season. The 2003 season saw Kings Dominion become the final of several of the Paramount Parks to open a Drop Zone: Stunt Tower, now Drop Tower: Scream Zone. The  Drop Zone at Kings Dominion was the tallest freefall ride in the world at the time it opened. In 2004, Kings Dominion added Scooby-Doo! And the Haunted Mansion; similar Scooby-Doo-themed dark rides had opened at three other Paramount Parks during the three previous seasons. In the next season, Kings Dominion added a Huss Top Spin called Tomb Raider: Firefall, and was named The Crypt, which was a standard size and outdoor version of a similar, but larger, ride named Tomb Raider: The Ride, also now The Crypt, at Kings Island. The differences between the two were that at Kings Dominion riders' feet dangle freely and at Kings Island, which installed a Giant Top Spin, there was a floor. In the 2006 season, Kings Dominion opened the Italian Job Turbo Coaster, its fourth launched roller coaster. The coaster was later be renamed the Backlot Stunt Coaster in 2008. It is similar to the Backlot Stunt Coaster rides at Kings Island and Canada's Wonderland, which both opened in 2005.

On May 22, 2006, Cedar Fair announced the purchase of all five Paramount Parks. The sale was finalized on June 30, 2006 for $1.24 billion. The park continued to operate as Paramount's Kings Dominion until the beginning of the 2007 season when Paramount was dropped from the title.

Cedar Fair era (2007–present)
Control of Paramount Parks had been transferred from Viacom to CBS Corporation in 2007. Kings Dominion expanded WaterWorks for the 2007 season, adding a second wave pool called Tidal Wave Bay, a four-person family raft slide called Zoom Flume, and a ProSlide Tornado.

During the Cedar Fair era, the park introduced Halloween Haunt. While the park had always had a Halloween event, the new HAUNT event has been received very well.

In December 2006, Kings Dominion put Hypersonic XLC up for sale. The park announced plans to keep it running until a buyer was found. It remained in operation during the 2007 season and was closed and dismantled several weeks before the 2008 season started. Also during the 2007–2008 offseason, Cedar Fair renamed the park's last two rides to open with Paramount theming. Drop Zone Stunt Tower became Drop Tower Scream Zone and The Italian Job: Turbo Coaster became Backlot Stunt Coaster.  Tomb Raider: Firefall received the name The Crypt. The Paramount Theater also changed its name to Kings Dominion Theater.

The 2008 and 2009 seasons saw Kings Dominion receive three rides that had operated at Geauga Lake during its dry amusement park's final season. On October 23, 2007, Kings Dominion announced that Dominator, a floorless roller coaster, would be moved to Kings Dominion and located in the International Street section. Dominator opened on May 24, 2008, becoming Kings Dominion's first roller coaster with five inversions. For the 2009 season, two flat rides once located at Geauga Lake, like Dominator, opened in 2008. Located near Rebel Yell, Americana became Kings Dominion's first Ferris wheel.

For the 2010 season, Kings Dominion opened Intimidator 305, a  giga coaster by Intamin. The ride, which is themed to NASCAR driver Dale Earnhardt, was announced on August 20, 2009, and represents the park's largest-ever capital investment. It was opened to the public in May 2010. Also for the 2010 season, the Kidzville and Nickelodeon Universe areas of the park began being re-themed to Planet Snoopy, as were the children's areas at Canada's Wonderland and Kings Island. The park has renamed the Hanna-Barbera-themed rides in Kidzville to match the Planet Snoopy theme, ending the park's 35-year run with Scooby-Doo and other Hanna-Barbera characters.

For the 2012 season, Kings Dominion installed WindSeeker in the Grove section of the park next to the Juke Box Diner. There are other versions of the ride in Cedar Fair parks such as Canada's Wonderland, Cedar Point, Kings Island, Knott's Berry Farm, and Carowinds. The ride stands  and gives riders a view of the surrounding area. Kings Dominion also added Dinosaurs Alive!, an upcharge dinosaur walkthrough exhibit, located in the Old Virginia section of the park. This attraction also appeared at Kings Island, Dorney Park, Cedar Point, and Canada's Wonderland.

For the 2013 season, Planet Snoopy merged with KidZville during a  expansion to form the largest Planet Snoopy in the Cedar Fair chain. There are now 18 attractions covering .

For the 2014 season, Kings Dominion commemorated the 40th anniversary of Lion Country Safari and the preview-opening of Kings Dominion by returning park icons from past eras. These icons included the return of the classic singing mushrooms, the repainting of Anaconda, an improved queue line for Volcano: The Blast Coaster, the return of classic blue ice cream, among other additions. They also returned the Rebel Yell roller coaster to its original red and blue colors. The 2014 season also saw the return of the iconic floral clock, the popular clown band, and the renaming of Johnny's and Trail's End Grill restaurants to the original names, Dinner Bell and Hungry Hippo, respectively. New lighting packages were added to the International Street fountains and Rebel Yell. The Congo and Grove sections of the park were returned to the original themes, Safari Village and Candy Apple Grove, respectively.

For the 2015 season, Kings Dominion continued in celebration of its 40th anniversary with a major expansion to WaterWorks. The expansion included a new 65-foot tall slide complex featuring three different attractions called Paradise Plunge, Aqua Blast, and Thunder Falls; a new children's area called Splash Island; expanded cabana areas, updated bathhouses, and other improvements to the area. As part of the major water park expansion, the area was renamed Soak City. On August 9, 2015, Shockwave closed in Candy Apple Grove permanently, and a swinging pendulum ride titled "Delirium" was built in its place. Hurler closed permanently at the end of the season on November 1, 2015. In 2017, Planet Snoopy was expanded with the addition of three new children's rides in the former Nickelodeon Central side of the area. On October 15, 2016, Kings Dominion announced that the Hurler wooden coaster would be permanently closed.

For the 2018 season, Kings Dominion opened Twisted Timbers on March 24, 2018, three years after Hurler operated for the last time, converting the track from wood to steel. It was built by Rocky Mountain Construction utilizing many of the original wooden supports from Hurler. 2018 also marked the debut of WinterFest, a Christmas-themed holiday event, during the winter season. The Rebel Yell and Ricochet coasters were renamed Racer 75 and Apple Zapple, respectively. Tornado, Dinosaurs Alive, and Volcano: The Blast Coaster were all removed before the 2019 season.

In August 2019, Kings Dominion announced that Soak City would be expanded in 2020 to include a new sub-area called Coconut Shores, featuring a multi-level water play structure and a children's wave pool. In January 2020, the park also announced the removal of The Crypt to make room for future development in the Safari Village section of the park.

Kings Dominion did not open for its normal operating schedule in 2020 due to the COVID-19 pandemic. After restrictions were partially lifted by Virginia governor Ralph Northam in November 2020, the park opened for a limited capacity winter event titled "Taste of the Season" that operated for three weeks the following month in December. The event featured specialty food trucks, seasonal decorations, a small selection of rides.

Normal operation resumed for the 2021 season, and in August of that year, the park announced that Safari Village would receive a makeover for 2022. The upgraded section of the park, Jungle X-Pedition, is themed to an archeological research facility and dig site. The area received similarly-themed restaurants and retail shops, as well as a new roller coaster named Tumbili, a 4D Free Spin model manufactured by S&S – Sansei Technologies.

Areas and attractions

Candy Apple Grove
Candy Apple Grove was known as Coney Island when the park first opened in 1975. It was renamed Candy Apple Grove in 1976. The area is Kings Dominion's largest section in the park, and in its early years, it featured an orchard theme that included three apple-themed rides: Apple Turnover, Bad Apple, and Adam's Apple. Much of the apple-related themes were removed over the years, and the area became known as simply The Grove when it merged with the former Wayne's World area in 2001.
 
As part of Kings Dominion's 40th-anniversary celebration in 2014, The Grove was restored to its original orchard theme, and the name was changed back to Candy Apple Grove. The animatronic Singing Mushrooms, popular decades ago, was redeveloped with newer technology and placed back on display. Other features that made a return to the area include a fully restored floral clock near the Carousel, oversized candy apples, and the popular blue ice cream that existed in the park for decades.

The westernmost corner of Candy Apple Grove, distinct from the rest of the area, is themed to the 1950s.

Some of the area's more notable rides include WindSeeker, a  swing ride that opened in 2012, and Delirium, a type of pendulum amusement ride that opened in place of stand-up roller coaster Shockwave in 2016. Candy Apple Grove's newest ride, steel coaster Twisted Timbers, opened in 2018 replacing Hurler and reusing some of the previous support structure. In addition to rides, the area features an arcade, carnival games, counter-service restaurants, and a gift shop.

Jungle X-Pedition 
Jungle X-Pedition is themed to an archeological base camp in a mysterious jungle. The area's fictional backstory centers around an explorer who discovered the uncharted land in 1935, naming the location "Site X." Initially, the area was part of one of the park's original attractions, Lion Country Safari, which contained a monorail train through a nature preserve until its closure in the 1990s. The area's name changed from Lion Country Safari to Safari Village in the mid-1980s and was changed again by Paramount to Congo in the 1990s. In 2014, the area's name reverted to Safari Village to commemorate the park's 40th anniversary. For the 2022 season, the area was rethemed to Jungle X-Pedition, which includes new immersive theming elements, dining, shopping, and a new roller coaster, Tumbili.

The area is home to many of the park's thrill rides and roller coasters. From 1979 until 2019, the area was anchored by a large artificial mountain, originally home to the Lost World ride complex and later to Volcano: The Blast Coaster; the structure was demolished with the coaster in spring 2019.

International Street
International Street is the park's main entry area, featuring a  fountain pool in the center of the walkway leading up to the 1/3 scale replica of the Eiffel Tower at the end of the street. The area is themed to a showcase of various European cultures, with buildings representing France, Germany, Switzerland, Spain, and Italy. Originally, only the walkway and its shops were considered part of the International Street area; during the park's Paramount seasons, the boundaries of International Street expanded to include the Action Theater.

Old Virginia

Along with International Street, Old Virginia is the only original section of Kings Dominion that has kept its same name throughout the park's history. Set in the Blue Ridge Mountains, the area has a vintage, rustic theme marked by its wooded architecture and country-style decor. An Intamin Flying Dutchman flat ride called Jamestown Landing operated in Old Virginia through the 1970s, and was removed in 1980. A steam train ride called Old Dominion Line operated nearby in the same park section. It has since been removed.

Planet Snoopy
The section originally opened as Nickelodeon Splat City in 1995, and was later renamed Nickelodeon Central in 2000. It was re-themed to the Peanuts for the 2010 season. In 2013, Cedar Fair merged the KidZville section of the park and introduced 12 new and re-themed attractions. Another expansion in 2017 updated the former Nickelodeon Central area of Planet Snoopy with three new attractions and a covered pavilion area.

Soak City

Soak City, formerly known as WaterWorks, is Kings Dominion's water park. It opened in 1992 as Hurricane Reef and is included with admission to Kings Dominion. In 2015, the water park was expanded and re-branded as Soak City.

Fast Lane

Fast Lane is Kings Dominion's virtual queue system. For an increased cost, visitors get a wristband enabling them to get to the front of the line on 17 of the most popular attractions without queueing.

Halloween Haunt

Halloween Haunt is an annual Halloween event at Kings Dominion on weekends during the months of September and October. It debuted in 2001 as FearFest, but following Cedar Fair's acquisition of the park, the event was renamed Halloween Haunt in 2007. In 2017, Kings Dominion's Halloween Haunt was voted the second-best theme park Halloween event by USA Today. Kings Dominion cancelled the event in 2020 due to the COVID-19 pandemic.

In 2013, Halloween Haunt featured a walk-through maze called Miner's Revenge.  Advertisements for the attraction characterized it as "the worst coal mine accident in history," and the attraction featured depictions of dead miners' bodies that had been mangled by a mining disaster. The attraction drew criticism in the press due to the region's experience with mining disasters. Washington Post writer Peter Galuszka (author of a book on the Upper Big Branch Mine disaster) said the attraction "hits a little too close to home for me" since "the idea of abandonment is a difficult topic for miners". He added, "At Kings Dominion, the suggestion of living miners left to die is meant to inject some enjoyable dramatic tension". Kathleen Geier of Washington Monthly decried, "agonizing deaths are being served up for fun and profit to the gawking, peanut-crunching masses" and asked, "What next – a thrill ride based on the Rana Plaza factory disaster in Bangladesh? Auschwitz: The Theme Park?". Following the controversy, Kings Dominion dropped Miner's Revenge from its Halloween maze lineup the following season.

Attractions
:

Timeline
 1974: Preview event featuring a film theater, Scooby-Doo (now called Woodstock Express), and Lion Country Safari.
 1975: Grand opening, Eiffel Tower, Rebel Yell (wooden coaster), and Galaxie (steel coaster)
 1976: Apple Turnover (Enterprise flat ride)
 1977: King Kobra (Steel coaster)
 1978: Kings Dominion Campground
 1979: Lost World (Themed area) featuring Journey to Atlantis, Land of the Dooz and Time Shaft
 1980: Haunted River replaced Journey to Atlantis
 1982: Grizzly and Amphitheater
 1983: White Water Canyon; Galaxie coaster closed
 1984: Berserker; Smurf Mountain replaced Land of the Dooz
 1985: Diamond Falls and Scooby's Play Park
 1986: Shockwave; King Kobra removed
 1987: Racing Rivers
 1988: Avalanche
 1989: Sky Pilot (replaced Monster)
 1990: Hanna-Barbera Land expansion
 1991: Anaconda
 1992: Hurricane Reef (Water park)
 1993: Days of Thunder; Smurf Mountain removed
 1994: Hurler; Old Dominion Line steam train removed
 1995: Nickelodeon Splat City; The Time Shaft and The Haunted River are removed, leaving The Lost World completely empty
 1996: Flight of Fear and Xtreme SkyFlyer
 1997: Taxi Jam; Hanna-Barbera Land renamed KidZville
 1998: Volcano; Action Theater replaces Days of Thunder
 1999: Expansion of Hurricane Reef to WaterWorks
 2000: Nickelodeon Central; Pipeline Peak added to WaterWorks
 2001: HyperSonic XLC (Xtreme Launch Coaster); Stan Lee's 7th Portal 3D (feature in Action Theater); Shockwave and Anaconda repainted with new colors
 2002: Ricochet and Triple Spin; Meteor Attack (feature in Action Theater); Diamond Falls closes
 2003: Drop Tower and SpongeBob SquarePants 3-D (feature in Action Theater)
 2004: Scooby-Doo & The Haunted Mansion
 2005: Tomb Raider Firefall (later known as The Crypt)
 2006: Backlot Stunt Coaster and Thunder Raceway Go-Karts
 2007: Tidal Wave Bay, Tornado and Zoom Flume added to WaterWorks; FearFest becomes Halloween Haunt
 2008: Dominator (Originally from the now-closed amusement park Geauga Lake); Hypersonic XLC removed
 2009: El Dorado and Americana (both relocated from Geauga Lake); Grizzly retracked
 2010: Intimidator 305 (Intamin Giga Coaster); Nickelodeon Central becomes Planet Snoopy; Boo Blasters on Boo Hill replaces Scooby-Doo & The Haunted Mansion; Rebel Yell retracked
 2011:  Snoopy's Starlight Spectular; Shockwave repainted a new color; Grizzly retracked; El Dorado closes
 2012: WindSeeker and Dinosaurs Alive!; Fast Lane debuts; Dinosaur 3D replaces SpongeBob SquarePants 3-D (motion seats removed), this was the final year for Snoopy's Splash Dance, Yogi's Cave and 5 other Kidzville rides.
 2013: Planet Snoopy  expansion and merges with KidZville; 8 new rides were added.
 2014: 40th Anniversary celebration; International Street fountain restored, Candy Apple Grove and Safari Village return; Volcano: The Blast Coaster and Anaconda retrofitted.
 2015: 40th Anniversary celebration continues; WaterWorks expands and is renamed to Soak City with new attractions including Aqua Blast, Paradise Plunge, Splash Island and Thunder Falls; Shockwave and Hurler close
 2016: Delirium opens in place of Shockwave
 2017: Planet Snoopy expansion with the addition of Kite Eating Tree, Sally's Sea Plane, and Peanuts 500; Tornado closes
 2018: Twisted Timbers and WinterFest. Rebel Yell renamed Racer 75 and Ricochet renamed Apple Zapple.
 2019: Big Wave Bay, Dinosaurs Alive, and Volcano: The Blast Coaster close
 2020: The Crypt is removed; park closed until December due to the COVID-19 pandemic
 2021: Coconut Shores area opens in Soak City with Lighthouse Landing and Sand Dune Lagoon, replacing Big Wave Bay and Soak City Splash House
 2022: Tumbili coaster replaces The Crypt. Avalanche renamed Reptilian and Scrambler renamed Arachnidia.
2023: Year Round operations start; Grizzly retracked.

Retired rides and attractions

Former roller coasters

Other rides
 1974-1993: Lion Country Safari
 1975–1983: Adam's Apple/Vertigo (Himalaya ride)
 1975–1984: Flying Carpets
 1975–1995: Old Dominion Line (steam train)
 1975–1995: Sky Ride (two entrances, one next to the Racer 75 and one in (Planet Snoopy)Hanna-Barbera Land; one entrance still stands)
 1975–1988: Bad Apple (Monster)
 1975–2011: Yogi's Cave (renamed and rethemed later, did not open in 2012 and was demolished after the season was over, replaced by Snoopy's Junction)
 1976–1993: Apple Turnover (Enterprise ride next to Lake Charles)
 1976–1990: Mt. Kilimanjaro (Bayern Kurve)
 1976–1983: Flying Bobs
 1979–1980: Lost World Mountain: Journey to Atlantis (replaced by Haunted River)
 1979–1995: Lost World Mountain: The Time Shaft
 1979–1983: Lost World Mountain: Journey to the Land of Dooz
 1980–1995: Lost World Mountain: The Haunted River
 1984–1993: Smurf Mountain
 1985–2002: Diamond Falls (shoot the chute) (located where Backlot Stunt Coaster sits)
 1986–1996: Fred's Jungle Gym (children's play area)
 1987–1996: Racing Rivers (waterslide complex)
 1989–1998: Sky Pilot (Located near Racer 75 in Candy Apple Grove)
 1992–2004: Kiddie Cove (children's area of WaterWorks(Soak City))
 1992–2007: Spiral Chute (two, body waterslides next to the Anaconda roller coaster)
 1992–2014: Shoot-The-Curl (water slide, demolished to make room for a food stand)
 1995–2012: Snoopy's Splash Dance (formerly Nickelodeon Green Slime Zone)
 1997–2012: KidZville (This section became part of Planet Snoopy in 2013.)
 1998-2019: Soak City Splash House (children's water play area; replaced by Lighthouse Landing)
 1999–2019: Big Wave Bay (wave pool)
 2005–2019:  The Crypt (HUSS Park Attractions Top Spin) (replaced by Tumbili in 2022)
 2007–2017: Tornado (a ProSlide Tornado water slide at Soak City)
 2009–2011: El Dorado (where the WindSeeker is now located)
 2010–2016: Snoopy's Moon Bounce (replaced by Sally's Sea Plane)
 2012–2018: Dinosaurs Alive! (animatronic dinosaur walkthrough)

Kings Dominion logos

In popular culture
Parts of the 1977 movie Rollercoaster were filmed at Kings Dominion, and the park was involved in a major part of the film's plot.

See also 
Incidents at Kings Dominion

References

External links

 
 

 
Cedar Fair amusement parks
1975 establishments in Virginia
Amusement parks in Virginia
Landmarks in Virginia
Buildings and structures in Hanover County, Virginia
Tourist attractions in Hanover County, Virginia
Interstate 95
Amusement parks opened in 1975